The 1942 Georgetown Hoyas football team was an American football team that represented Georgetown University as an independent during the 1942 college football season. In their 11th season under head coach Jack Hagerty, the Hoyas compiled a 5–3–1 record and were outscored by a total of 115 to 92. The team played its home games at Griffith Stadium in Washington, D.C.

Schedule

References

Georgetown
Georgetown Hoyas football seasons
Georgetown Hoyas football